"Turn Back the Hands of Time" is a song recorded by American R&B singer Tyrone Davis.  It was co-written by Jack Daniels and Bonnie Thompson and produced by Willie Henderson. 

"Turn Back the Hands of Time" was released as a single in February 1970 and became Davis's second major hit, spending two weeks at number one on Billboard's R&B Singles chart and reaching number three on its Pop chart. The single was also certified gold by the RIAA for sales of one million copies. "Turn Back the Hands of Time" is from the album of the same name that MTV says "ranks among the best soul LP's of its time".

Background
Daniels and Thompson wrote "Turn Back the Hands of Time" based on relationship problems Daniels was having at the time. Daniels had co-written Davis's 1968 hit "Can I Change My Mind" and the recording session for "Turn Back the Hands of Time" included some of the same musicians from that session.

Chart history

Year-end charts

Personnel
Background vocals by Barbara Acklin, Eugene Record & Robert Lester
Bass guitar by Billy Robinson
Drums by Quinton Joseph
Guitar by Carl Woolfolk
Keyboards by Floyd Morris
Lead vocals by Tyrone Davis
Written by Jack Daniels & Bonnie Thompson
Produced by Willie Henderson
Arranged by Tom-Tom Washington

Other versions
Checkmates, Ltd. on their 1971 album, Life.
Otis Clay 7" on Elka Records 1975.
Bruce Springsteen on his 2022 album, Only the Strong Survive.

Use in media
The song appears in the 1995 movie, Nine Months.

References
[ "Turn Back the Hands of Time" song review] on Allmusic website

1970 singles
Checkmates, Ltd. songs